New York State Route 315 (NY 315) is a state highway in Oneida County, New York, in the United States. It begins at an intersection with NY 12 in the village of Waterville and ends at a junction NY 12B in the hamlet of Deansboro, located in the town of Marshall. NY 315 was assigned as part of the 1930 renumbering of state highways in New York.

Route description

At the southern end, NY 315 begins in Waterville at an intersection with NY 12. Paralleling Big Creek, the route heads northwestward through mostly rural and residential land. The route, locally known as Buell Avenue along this stretch of its source, crosses several of the creek's tributaries as it progresses towards the hamlet of Deansboro, where it bends slightly westward and uneventfully terminates at NY 12B. Approximately midway between Waterville and Deansboro is Forge Hollow. Here, the road makes an S-shaped turn around Big Creek and one finds a rock face with caves and a natural spring. The entire route is five miles long.

History
NY 315 was assigned to its current alignment during the 1930 state highway renumbering. Since then, it has not undergone any major alterations.

Major intersections

See also

References

External links

315
Transportation in Oneida County, New York